The 1986 All-Ireland Senior Ladies' Football Championship Final was the thirteenth All-Ireland Final and the deciding match of the 1986 All-Ireland Senior Ladies' Football Championship, an inter-county ladies' Gaelic football tournament for the top teams in Ireland.

This was the first final played at Gaelic Athletic Association headquarters in Croke Park. Kerry won by six points.

References

!
All-Ireland Senior Ladies' Football Championship Finals
Kerry county ladies' football team matches
Wexford county ladies' football team matches
All-Ireland